The governor of Isabela is the chief executive of the provincial government of Isabela.

List of governors of Isabela

There have been twenty eight (28) provincial governors of Isabela since the establishment of the civil government in 1901 after the Philippine-American War.

References

Isabela
Government of Isabela (province)